Gaylyne Ayugi (born 1994) is a Kenyan model and beauty pageant titleholder who was crowned as Miss Universe Kenya 2014 and represented the country at the Miss Universe 2014 pageant.

Early life 
Ayugi was born and grew up in Nairobi. Currently, she is a journalism student at Zetech College in Nairobi. Additionally, she is a dancer team and a fashion model in her country.

Pageantry

Miss Universe Kenya 2014 
According to the new national director in Nairobi, Maria Sarungi Tsehai who led the Miss Universe Tanzania Organization. The Miss Universe Kenya will be returned for the Miss Universe 2014. in the first time after 8 years absent at the pageant, Ayugi Gaylyne getting the new title of Miss Kenya for Miss Universe 2014. She was crowned in Nairobi, Kenya on November 8, 2014.

Miss Universe 2014 
Ayugi competed at Miss Universe 2014 but did not place.

References

External links 
 Official website

1994 births
Living people
Miss Universe 2014 contestants
People from Nairobi
Kenyan female models
Kenyan beauty pageant winners